Sea-Watch is a German non-governmental organisation that operates in the Mediterranean Sea, notably by commissioning ships to rescue migrants.

History
On 6 November 2017, the crew of a Sea-Watch ship rescued 58 people in an operation hindered by the Libyan Navy. Twenty other people drowned. Video footage that implicated the Libyan Coast Guard was later used in legal action against Italy in the European Court of Human Rights.

2018 
The ship Sea-Watch resumed her operations in November 2018 after it was detained in Malta between July and October.

On 22 December 2018, another of the organisation's ships, Sea-Watch 3, rescued around 32 people, but was unable to dock in Malta, Italy, or Spain.

2019 

On 3 January 2019, France, Germany and the Netherlands offered to take some of the 49 migrants blocked off Malta on Sea-Watch and Sea-Eye "as a collective allocation effort". According to Mina Andreeva, the spokeswoman of the European Commission, more solidarity is needed along with "foreseeable and sustainable solutions for the landing and re-localization in the Mediterranean"; she quoted the commissioner in charge of migration, Dimitris Avramopoulos.

On 9 January, they were finally allowed to disembark in Malta after an agreement to relocate them to eight other European countries was reached. On 19 January, Sea-Watch 3 rescued 47 further migrants. The Italian government forbade her from entering the port, and initiated legal action against the Netherlands; the organisation referred the case to the European Court of Human Rights. On 29 January, Italy, Germany, France, Malta, Portugal, Romania, and Luxembourg agreed to relocate the 47 migrants. Deputy Prime Minister of Italy Matteo Salvini demanded that Sea-Watch 3 be detained. As the ship was docked at the Italian city Catania to land the migrants, she was blocked by the Italian military on the grounds of "several non-conformities"; the organisation called the obstruction political pressure.

On 19 May 2019, the Italian police seized Sea-Watch 3 at the island Lampedusa, allowing the disembarking of the 47 migrants whom she had recently picked up on 15 May 2019. Reports of the operations angered Matteo Salvini, who opposed the landing of the migrants. In June 2019, the ship was again detained; 53 migrants had been rescued from the coast of Libya on 12 June. Italy allowed only 11 especially vulnerable people to disembark; on 25 June 2019, the captain of Sea-Watch 3 threatened to land at Lampedusa in spite of the interdiction, eventually entering Italian territorial waters. According to the organisation, it was "not as a provocative act, but out of necessity and responsibility". A column in French newspaper Le Monde stated that Captain Carola Rackete was only "reminding us all of the existence of international conventions such as that stating rescue at sea is a duty for all". In an editorial in the same newspaper, 700 celebrities supported the migrants and opposed Salvini. A poll by Italian daily Il Giornale showed that 61% of Italians were opposed to Sea-Watch 3 landing at Lampedusa. During the night of 28 to 29 June, the ship was seized, and Carola Rackete was arrested for helping illegal immigration. Sea-Watch 3 later collided with the 50-knot Class 800 patrol boat "808" of Italian law enforcement agency Guardia di Finanza, which had tried to block the larger vessel from docking. The boat was pushed against the dock and slightly damaged. Since the Guardia di Finanza was legally considered a combatant while it protected waterways, the Italian media reported that Rackete could also be charged with attack on a warship, a crime punishable with 3 to 10 years in prison. Two days later, an Italian judge decided that no further incarceration was necessary, and Rackete was released. , the criminal investigation continues.

Ships 
Sea-Watch is a former  fishing ship. Built in 1917 and purchased in 2015, Sea-Watch used her in 2015 until she was transferred later that year to the organisation Mare Liberum, receiving the name Mare Liberum.

Sea-Watch 2 is a former fishing research ship, originally entering service as Clupea in 1968. She was deployed on 14-day rescue operations between Libya and Malta in 2016 and 2017 along with Sea-Watch. Sold to the organisation Mission Lifeline, she now operates under the name Lifeline.

Sea-Watch 3 is a  ship. Built in 1972 as an offshore supply ship, the organisation Médecins Sans Frontières commissioned it as a search and rescue vessel under the name Dignity I before transfer to Sea-Watch.

Sea-Watch 4 is a  ship. Built in 1976 as a research ship, the Evangelical Church in Germany formed an association to buy the ship in early 2020. The ship is run by a cooperation between Sea-Watch and Médecins Sans Frontières and operated as a German-flagged rescue vessel in the Mediterranean Sea since August 2020.

Reconnaissance aircraft 
Since 2017, Sea-Watch have operated a SAR-coordinating reconnaissance aircraft, Moonbird, a single-engined Cirrus SR22, and since June 2020, also the Seabird, a twin-engined high-performance Beechcraft Baron 58. These are flown in cooperation with the Swiss NGO Humanitarian Pilots Initiative.

See also 
 2013 Lampedusa migrant shipwreck
 Operation Mare Nostrum
 Pia Klemp
 Hellenic Rescue Team
 Iuventa
 Mediterranea Saving Humans
 Migrant Offshore Aid Station
 No Border network
 Proactiva Open Arms
 SOS Méditerranée

References

External links 
 
 Current position of Sea-Watch3 on vesselfinder.com

Organizations established in 2015
European migrant crisis